Jacopo Bassano (c. 1510 – 14 February 1592), known also as Jacopo dal Ponte, was an Italian painter who was born and died in Bassano del Grappa near Venice, and took the village as his surname. Trained in the workshop of his father, Francesco the Elder, and studying under Bonifazio Veronese in Venice, he painted mostly religious paintings including landscape and genre scenes. He often treated biblical themes in the manner of rural genre scenes, portraying people who look like local peasants and depicting animals with real interest. Bassano's pictures were very popular in Venice because of their depiction of animals and nocturnal scenes. His four sons: Francesco Bassano the Younger, Giovanni Battista da Ponte, Leandro Bassano, and Girolamo da Ponte, also became artists and followed him closely in style and subject matter.

Life 

He was born around 1510 in the town of Bassano del Grappa, located about 65 km from the city of Venice. His father, Francesco il Vecchio, was a locally successful painter who had established a family workshop that primarily produced religious works in the local style.  During his early youth, Bassano was an apprentice in his father's workshop. He eventually made his way to Venice in the 1530s, during which he studied under Bonifazio de Pitati (also known as Bonifazio Veronese) and was exposed to such famous artists as Titian and il Pordenone.  After his father's death in 1539 he returned to Bassano del Grappa and permanently set up residence there, even taking a local woman, Elisabetta Merzari, as his wife in 1546. He took over the management of his family workshop, which would eventually come to include his four sons, Leandro Bassano, Francesco Bassano the Younger, Giovanni Battista da Ponte, and Girolamo da Ponte. After his death in 1592, his sons continued to produce numerous works in his style, making it difficult for later art historians to establish which pieces were created by Jacopo himself and which works were created at the hands of his progeny.

Jacopo Bassano was considered unique amongst his fellow Renaissance artists by his ability to incorporate diverse artistic influences (including Dürer, Parmigianino, Tintoretto, and Raphael) into his work despite his reluctance to leave the comfort of his home town. He is believed to have learned about their art by seeing their prints, of which he was most likely an avid collector.

Works 

Bassano's ability to experiment and absorb stylistic qualities from other contemporary artists is evident in the four distinct periods seen in his artistic legacy. Each period shows the artist's work in reconciling his own aesthetics with the styles of his peers.

Early works, the 1530s and onward
Bonifazio de Pitati imparted upon his young pupil a lasting appreciation of Titian's work, the influence of which is clearly seen in his early pieces. Bassano's earliest paintings exhibit his lifelong obsession with brilliant colours that he had seen in Titian's beginning works, particularly in Bassano's Supper at Emmaus (1538). In this commission for a local church, Bassano fills the canvas with rich, luminous colours that help distinguish the figures from their surrounding environment. He breaks away from the practices of his contemporaries by placing the figure of Christ towards the back of the scene and allowing the lay people around him to play a more significant part in the composition of the piece. They are also unique in their dress. Instead of clothing his figures in the draping, shapeless fabrics many Renaissance artists equated with Classical Roman fashion, Bassano chose to feature figures in 16th-century clothing. The details of this piece are the most often discussed aspect of it. To many art historians his inclusion of various food on the tables, a dog lying down and a cat slinking around the chairs, as well as numerous secondary characters is a testament to Bassano's practice of drawing from life instead of relying on stylistic conventions of the age.

Mannerism
Bassano's piece, The Last Supper (1542), shows his new interest in Mannerism in Italian art.  Within the piece he expressed influences related to contemporary prints of Dürer and paintings of Raphael. This is especially expressed in the highly charged emotions of the subjects and the dynamic and highly stylized posture of the figures.  The Mannerist preoccupation with highly developed design elements is evident in Bassano's careful placement and "character" of the figures to create an active composition that leads the viewer's eyes around every detail of the canvas. Compared to earlier figures, which were more staid, Bassano's figures in The Last Supper seem alive, their skin suggesting muscles and sinews below rather than the wooden, tired postures of his early work.

Bassano started experimenting with light and his subjects around the 1550s–1570s. It was during this period that he was one of the first artists to paint a "nocturne", or a painting in a nighttime landscape with artificial lighting. This type of painting was extremely popular with local audiences and made Bassano paintings highly valued. His works also began to feature more prominently pastoral elements, which were both painted by his father and part of his environment. Rather than placing religious scenes in Classical Roman settings (as his Renaissance counterparts did), he placed figures in a more natural landscape, where the trees and the flowers were as carefully rendered as his figures.

References

Further reading
 Aikema, Bernard (1996), Jacopo Bassano and His Public: Moralizing Pictures in an Age of Reform, ca. 1535-1600 (translated by Andrew P. McCormick), Princeton, N.J.: Princeton University Press.
 Rearick, W. R. (1993), Jacopo Bassano, 1510-1592, Fort Worth, Texas: Kimbell Art Museum.

External links

Jacopo Bassano in the Web Gallery of Art
Jacopo Bassano: Founder of Landscape Style

Italian Mannerist painters
Painters from Venice
1510s births
1592 deaths
Italian male painters
People from Bassano del Grappa
16th-century Italian painters
16th-century Venetian people